Peterborough City Council is the local authority for Peterborough in the East of England. It is a unitary authority, having the powers of a non-metropolitan county and district council combined. The City was incorporated as a municipal borough in 1874; from 1888, it fell within the jurisdiction of the Soke of Peterborough county council and from 1965, Huntingdon and Peterborough county council. In 1974, it was replaced by a wholly new non-metropolitan district, broadly corresponding to the Soke, in the new enlarged Cambridgeshire. In 1998, Peterborough became independent of Cambridgeshire as a unitary authority, but the city continues to form part of that county for ceremonial purposes as defined by the Lieutenancies Act 1997.

The leader and cabinet model of decision-making was adopted by the city council in 2001. It is a member of the East of England Local Government Association.

History

Incorporation
A public enquiry was held in 1873, to determine whether it would be advantageous for the city to be administered by a municipal corporation. The result being in the affirmative, the city council, sometimes archaically called the corporation, was founded by a Charter of Incorporation dated 17 March 1874, under the government of a mayor, six aldermen and 18 councillors. Something of an anomaly, the Parliamentary Boundary Commission of 1868 had decided that the urban parts of Fletton and Woodston were so involved in Peterborough that they ought to be in the borough and added the newly built-up portions of these parishes to the parliamentary constituency. In local matters they were still in Huntingdonshire and, as the City of Peterborough did not extend south of the River Nene, the full title of the new municipality was the City and Borough of Peterborough and its inhabitants, citizens and burgesses.

Watch committee
The new corporation was required to appoint a Watch Committee and a police force under the provisions of the County and Borough Police Act 1856. In 1947, the City of Peterborough Constabulary amalgamated with the Liberty of Peterborough Constabulary, which had shared its chief constable with Northamptonshire until 1931 and Peterborough thereafter, to form the Peterborough Combined Police force. This, in turn, merged into Mid-Anglia Constabulary in 1965 and was renamed Cambridgeshire Constabulary in 1974. The Fire Brigades Act 1938 made it a requirement for the corporation to maintain a fire brigade; under the Fire Services Act 1947 this function passed to the councils of counties.

Reorganisation

Expansion
In 1927, the city council submitted a memorial to the Minister of Health for permission to extend the borough boundary to include Gunthorpe, Longthorpe, Paston, Walton, Werrington and the area north-east of Fengate; this became effective from 1929. Until this point the council were using the Guildhall and a large number of subsidiary offices, but the need to widen Narrow Bridge Street and the need for a new Town Hall came together in a combined scheme, resulting in the building of the present Town Hall. It was opened in 1933 and accommodated both Peterborough city council and the former Soke of Peterborough county council.

Administrative county
Under the Local Government Act 1888, the ancient Soke of Peterborough formed an administrative county in its own right, with boundaries similar, although not identical, to the current unitary authority. Nonetheless, it remained geographically part of Northamptonshire until 1965, when the Soke of Peterborough was merged with Huntingdonshire to form the county of Huntingdon and Peterborough. The municipal borough covered the urban area only; under the Local Government Act 1972, Huntingdon and Peterborough was abolished and the current district created, including the outlying rural areas. However, as a result of intervening development and a new town project, this has a much larger population than the Soke had. Having petitioned for borough status under Section 245 of the Act, letters patent were granted continuing the style of the city over the wider area, which became part of the non-metropolitan county of Cambridgeshire.

Unitary authority
In 1998, the city gained autonomy from county council control as a unitary authority area, but it continues to form part of Cambridgeshire for ceremonial purposes. Policing in the city remains the responsibility of Cambridgeshire Constabulary. The police authority comprises 17 members, including nine councillors, of which seven are nominated by Cambridgeshire county council and two are nominated by Peterborough city council. Firefighting remains the responsibility of Cambridgeshire Fire and Rescue Service. The joint fire authority comprises 17 elected councillors, 13 from Cambridgeshire county council and four from Peterborough city council. Nowadays the Peterborough Volunteer Fire Brigade, one of few of its kind, effectively functions as a retained fire station, responding to calls as directed by Cambridgeshire Fire and Rescue Service.

In 2018 the council moved most of its staff from Peterborough Town Hall to modern facilities at Sand Martin House, a refurbished and extended Victorian railway building at Fletton Quays on the south side of the River Nene. Both Sand Martin House and the Town Hall are used for council meetings.

Governance

Executive model
The leader and cabinet model of decision-making, adopted by the city council under the Local Government Act 2000, is similar to national government. The council appoints the Leader (usually a member of the group with the political majority) and the leader appoints up to nine other councillors to serve on the cabinet. The cabinet members, one of whom is appointed Deputy Leader, assume responsibility for different key areas of local governance. The full council meets around ten times a year. There are decisions that only full council can make, these include setting budgets and spending programmes, setting council tax levels and approving major policies and priorities. In addition to the Leader of the Council, the council also appoints the Mayor of Peterborough, the Deputy Mayor, committee chairmen and the chief executive. The cabinet and committees report to, and are accountable to, council.

Budget
The council's budget for the financial year 2018/19 is £418.7m (down from £432.6m in 2017/18). The main source of non-school funding is the formula grant, which is paid by government to local authorities based on the services they provide. The remainder, to which the police and fire authorities (and parish council where this exists) set a precept, is raised from council tax and business rates. Following the 2010 Spending Review, the council announced that 11.1% could be cut from departmental budgets to save £65m over a five-year period and up to 181 posts could be lost.

Mayoralty
The city council elects a Mayor to serve for a term of one year. The role is now largely ceremonial, with political leadership provided instead by the Leader of the Council. Former leaders are listed with the historic election results. The Mayor has social and legal precedence in all places within the city unless HM the King or his personal representative, a close member of the Royal Family or the Lord Lieutenant is present. The Mayor also has a key democratic role to play, acting as a politically impartial chairman of the council and making sure that proper conduct takes place in the chamber during its meetings. The Mayor does not take part in debate or vote, except to break ties. Mayoralty of the unitary authority has been held by the following councillors:

Joint committees
The East of England Regional Assembly was based at Flempton, near Bury St. Edmunds in Suffolk. The assembly was created as a voluntary regional chamber by the Regional Development Agencies Act 1998 and the first meeting was held in March 1999. Following criticism of the regional assemblies, it was proposed in 2007 that they would be axed, losing their role by 2010. It was replaced by the East of England Local Government Association who established a Regional Strategy Board to act as Local Authority Leaders' Board under the provisions of the Local Democracy, Economic Development and Construction Act 2009. This role ended in 2010, with the abolition of statutory regional planning in England.

GO East, the Government Office for the East of England, co-ordinated the functions of national government in the region until 2011. The abolition of the Government Office network was announced in the 2010 Spending Review.

A combined authority for Cambridgeshire and Peterborough was established in 2017, with the first mayoral elections taking place on 4 May.

Political control

Political control of the unitary authority has been held by the following groups:

In 2016, every councillor was up for re-election following changes made by the Local Government Boundary Commission for England. The Conservative group currently run the council on a minority basis with the support of the three Werrington First Councillors and the casting vote of the Conservative Mayor.

Wards and councillors
The council comprises 60 councillors who represent the city and surrounding villages. Each councillor typically serves for a four-year term, representing an electoral ward. Wards are divided so that each councillor serves an average of around 2,000 electors.

These are (in alphabetical order): Barnack, Bretton, Central, Dogsthorpe, East, Eye, Thorney & Newborough, Fletton & Stanground, Fletton & Woodston, Glinton and Castor, Gunthorpe, Hampton Vale, Hargate and Hempsted, North, Orton Longueville, Orton Waterville, Park, Paston & Walton, Ravensthorpe, Stanground South, Werrington, West, Wittering. 15 wards comprise the Peterborough constituency for elections to the House of Commons, while the remaining seven fall within the North West Cambridgeshire constituency.

Independent and Werrington First councillors sit as an Independent group known as "Peterborough First" on the council.

** Julie Stevenson (Orton Waterville) resigned from the Green Party to sit as an Independent in June 2022.

*** Heather Skibsted (Orton Longueville) defected to the Green Party from Labour in July 2022.

Composition
Each ward elects up to three councillors by the first past the post system of election. Barnack and Wittering each elect one councillor, Glinton & Castor and West each elect two. All other wards elect three councillors. The current composition of the city council, following the 2021 elections, inclusive of defections and deaths, is:

District elections

Turnout
One third of the council is elected each year, followed by one year without elections. At the 2019 election, for example, there were 97 candidates from 9 parties contesting 20 seats and turnout at the polling stations ranged from 24% in Stanground South to 46% in Park ward.

Electoral fraud
In April 2008 a former Mayor, Mohammed Choudhary, was convicted for making a false instrument, namely a poll card, in connection with vote-rigging allegations during the 2004 election. In May 2008 chief executive, Gillian Beasley, said "People can have confidence in this result because measures that have been put in place have ensured that the vote was carried out within the law." Beasley also revealed the city council was to write a report on tackling election fraud, after the Electoral Commission said it could be adopted as best practice. As part of the drive to reduce election fraud, the council sent out blank registration forms, resulting in more than 8,000 people falling off the electoral roll.

Civil parishes
Civil parishes do not cover the whole of England and mostly exist in rural areas. They are usually administered by parish councils which have various local responsibilities. Parish councillors, like city councillors, are elected to represent the views of local people. Ailsworth, Bainton, Barnack, Borough Fen, Bretton, Castor, Deeping Gate, Etton, Eye, Glinton, Helpston, Marholm, Maxey, Newborough & Borough Fen, Northborough, Orton Longueville, Orton Waterville, Peakirk, Southorpe, Sutton, Thorney, Thornhaugh, Ufford, Wansford, Wittering, and Wothorpe & St Martin's Without each have a parish council. Wothorpe and St Martin's Without merged on 4 March 2020. The city council also works closely with Werrington neighbourhood association which operates on a similar basis to a parish council. Parish elections are held every four years on the ordinary day of election of councillors for the unitary authority. The central part of the Peterborough urban area is an unparished area.

2016 EU Referendum

On Thursday 23 June 2016 Peterborough voted in the 2016 EU Referendum under the provisions of the European Union Referendum Act 2015 where voters were asked to decide on the question "Should the United Kingdom remain a member of the European Union or leave the European Union?" by voting for either "Remain a member of the European Union" or "Leave the European Union". The result produced a large "Leave" majority by 61% of voters on a turnout of 72% across the city with only the wards of Peterborough Central, Barnack and late postal votes in the city council area returning "Remain" votes and all other wards returning "Leave" majority votes. The then local MP Stewart Jackson backed "Leave", whereas local MP Shailesh Vara campaigned for a "Remain" vote.

Result

Results by Council Wards

Arms

See also
Cambridgeshire local elections
Lord Lieutenant of Cambridgeshire
High Sheriff of Cambridgeshire

References

External links
Peterborough City Council
Local Government Commission for England

1874 establishments in England
Local authorities in Cambridgeshire
Leader and cabinet executives
Local education authorities in England
Billing authorities in England
Unitary authority councils of England